The following outline is provided as an overview of and topical guide to South Carolina:

South Carolina – state in the Southeastern United States on the Atlantic coast. Originally part of the Province of Carolina, the Province of South Carolina was the first of the Thirteen Colonies that declared independence from the British Crown during the American Revolution. South Carolina was the first state to ratify the Articles of Confederation, the 8th state to ratify the US Constitution on May 23, 1788. South Carolina later became the first state to vote to secede from the Union which it did on December 20, 1860. It was readmitted to the United States on June 25, 1868.

General reference 

 Names
 Common name: South Carolina
 Pronunciation: 
 Official name: State of South Carolina
 Abbreviations and name codes
 Postal symbol:  SC
 ISO 3166-2 code:  US-SC
 Internet second-level domain:  .sc.us
 Nicknames
 Palmetto State
 Sandlapper State
 Iodine Products State (in disuse) (previously used on license plates)
 Adjectivals
 South Carolina
 South Carolinian
 Demonym: South Carolinian

Geography of South Carolina 

Geography of South Carolina
 South Carolina is: a U.S. state, a federal state of the United States of America
 Location
 Northern hemisphere
 Western hemisphere
 Americas
 North America
 Anglo America
 Northern America
 United States of America
 Contiguous United States
 Eastern United States
 East Coast of the United States
 Southeastern United States
 Southern United States
 Deep South
 Population of South Carolina: 4,625,364  (2010 U.S. Census)
 Area of South Carolina:
 Atlas of South Carolina

Places in South Carolina 

 Historic places in South Carolina
 National Historic Landmarks in South Carolina
 National Register of Historic Places listings in South Carolina
 Bridges on the National Register of Historic Places in South Carolina
 National Natural Landmarks in South Carolina
 National parks in South Carolina
 State parks in South Carolina

Environment of South Carolina 

 Climate of South Carolina
 Protected areas in South Carolina
 State forests of South Carolina
 Superfund sites in South Carolina
 Wildlife of South Carolina
 Fauna of South Carolina
 Birds of South Carolina
 Reptiles
 Snakes of South Carolina

Natural geographic features of South Carolina 

 Rivers of South Carolina

Regions of South Carolina

Administrative divisions of South Carolina 

 The 46 counties of the state of South Carolina
 Municipalities in South Carolina
 Cities in South Carolina
 State capital of South Carolina:
 City nicknames in South Carolina
 Towns in South Carolina
 Census-designated places in South Carolina

Demography of South Carolina 

Demographics of South Carolina

Government and politics of South Carolina 

Politics of South Carolina
 Form of government: U.S. state government
 United States congressional delegations from South Carolina
 South Carolina State Capitol
 Elections in South Carolina
 Political party strength in South Carolina

Branches of the government of South Carolina 

Government of South Carolina

Executive branch of the government of South Carolina 
 Governor of South Carolina
 Lieutenant Governor of South Carolina
 Secretary of State of South Carolina
 State departments
 South Carolina Department of Transportation

Legislative branch of the government of South Carolina 

 South Carolina General Assembly (bicameral)
 Upper house: South Carolina Senate
 Lower house: South Carolina House of Representatives

Judicial branch of the government of South Carolina 

Courts of South Carolina
 Supreme Court of South Carolina

Law and order in South Carolina 

Law of South Carolina
 Cannabis in South Carolina
 Capital punishment in South Carolina
 Individuals executed in South Carolina
 Constitution of South Carolina
 Crime in South Carolina
 Gun laws in South Carolina
 Law enforcement in South Carolina
 Law enforcement agencies in South Carolina
 Same-sex marriage in South Carolina

Military in South Carolina 

 South Carolina Air National Guard
 South Carolina Army National Guard

History of South Carolina 

History of South Carolina

History of South Carolina, by period 
Indigenous peoples
Spanish colony of Florida, 1565–1763
English Province of Carolina, 1663–1707
French colony of Louisiane, 1699–1763
British Province of Carolina, 1707–1712
British Province of South Carolina, 1712–1776
French and Indian War, 1754–1763
Treaty of Fontainebleau of 1762
Treaty of Paris of 1763
British Indian Reserve, 1763–1783
Royal Proclamation of 1763
American Revolutionary War, April 19, 1775 – September 3, 1783
Treaty of Paris, September 3, 1783
State of South Carolina since 1776
Adopts a constitution for an independent State of South Carolina, March 15, 1776
United States Declaration of Independence, July 4, 1776
Cherokee–American wars, 1776–1794
Second state to ratify the Articles of Confederation and Perpetual Union, signed July 9, 1778
Western territorial claims ceded 1787
Eighth State to ratify the Constitution of the United States of America on May 23, 1788
War of 1812, June 18, 1812 – March 23, 1815
Treaty of Ghent, December 24, 1814
Andrew Jackson becomes seventh President of the United States on March 4, 1829
Mexican–American War, April 25, 1846 – February 2, 1848
First state to declare secession from the United States on December 20, 1860
Founding state of the Confederate States of America on February 8, 1861
American Civil War, April 12, 1861 – May 13, 1865
South Carolina in the American Civil War
Battle of Fort Sumter,  April 12–13, 1861
Carolinas Campaign, January 5 – April 26, 1865
South Carolina in Reconstruction, 1865–1868
Fifth former Confederate state readmitted to the United States on July 9, 1868
Conservative rule, 1870-1890
Tillman era and disfranchisement, 1890-1914
Roaring Twenties and Great Depression, 1914-1940
South Carolina in the civil rights movement, 1950-1970
Modern Era, 1970 - present

Culture of South Carolina 

Culture of South Carolina
 Museums in South Carolina
 Religion in South Carolina
 The Church of Jesus Christ of Latter-day Saints in South Carolina
 Episcopal Diocese of South Carolina (disambiguation)
 Scouting in South Carolina
 State symbols of South Carolina
 Flag of the State of South Carolina 
 Great Seal of the State of South Carolina

The arts in South Carolina 
 Music of South Carolina

Sports in South Carolina 

Sports in South Carolina

Economy and infrastructure of South Carolina 

Economy of South Carolina
 Communications in South Carolina
 Newspapers in South Carolina
 Radio stations in South Carolina
 Television stations in South Carolina
 Health care in South Carolina
 Hospitals in South Carolina
 Transportation in South Carolina
 Airports in South Carolina

Education in South Carolina 

Education in South Carolina
 Schools in South Carolina
 School districts in South Carolina
 High schools in South Carolina
 Colleges and universities in South Carolina
 University of South Carolina
 South Carolina State University
 Clemson University

See also

Topic overview:
South Carolina

Index of South Carolina-related articles

Notes

References

External links 

South Carolina
South Carolina
 1